Ghaniabad may refer to:

Ghaniabad, Razavi Khorasan
Ghaniabad, Semnan
Ghaniabad, Boshruyeh, South Khorasan Province
Ghaniabad, Tabas, South Khorasan Province
Ghaniabad, Tehran
Ghaniabad Rural District, in Tehran Province